Kalk Post is an underground station on the Cologne Stadtbahn lines 1 and 9, located in Cologne. The station lies at the intersection of Kalker Hauptstraße and Trimbornstraße in the district of Kalk. Köln-Trimbornstraße station is located some 200m to the south.

The station was opened in 1980 and consists of a mezzanine and two side platforms with two rail tracks.

See also 
 List of Cologne KVB stations

References

External links 
 
 station info page 
 station diagram map 

Cologne KVB stations
Kalk, Cologne
Railway stations in Germany opened in 1980